Sedgwick Middle School is public a middle school, located in the town of West Hartford, Connecticut, and is part of West Hartford Public Schools.

History 
Feeder schools for Sedgwick include Braeburn, Duffy, Charter Oak, Webster Hill and Wolcott. 

Sedgwick was a Blue Ribbon School in 1999–2000.

References

External links 
Sedgwick Middle School
William T. Sedgwick: a Man of Many Views

Buildings and structures in West Hartford, Connecticut
Schools in Hartford County, Connecticut
Public middle schools in Connecticut